Ram Bali Singh Chandravanshi (born 15 October 1963) is an Indian politician from the state of Bihar. Since the elections on June 29, 2020, he has been a member of the Bihar Legislative Council. He is also the President of Rashtriya Janata Dal Extremely Backward Cell. He currently also serves as an associate prof in Bihar National College of Patna University.

Early life and career 
He was born in a poor family of Village Ojha Bigha, Post Baidrabad, District Arwal on 15 October 1963. His father was Ramanand Singh. He is currently designated as HOD and Assistant Professor in Geology Department of BN College, Patna University. He also serves as an associate professor in Bihar National College of Patna University.

Education 
He Post Graduated in M.Sc. from Patna Science College (Department of Geology) from Patna University in 1987. He later completed his LLB  and got a degree in 1991 from Patna Law College under Patna University. Then he completed his PhD degree from Patna University in the year 2002.

Political career 
He started his political career with the Rashtriya Janata Dal Party,  He has made many movements at the district level and state level for the upliftment of the poor, dalit, backward and extremely backward society.  Rashtriya Janata Dal Party delegated him the state president of the Extremely Backward Cell, later [] as a member of Bihar Legislative Council on 29 June 2020.

References 

People from Arwal district
Living people
1963 births
Members of the Bihar Legislative Council
Rashtriya Janata Dal politicians
Academic staff of Bihar National College